Brydan Klein and Matt Reid won the title, defeating Riccardo Ghedin and Yi Chu-huan in the final 6–2, 7–6.(7–3)

Seeds

Draw

Draw

References 
 Draw

Dunlop World Challenge - Men's Doubles
2015 MD
2015 ATP Challenger Tour